Derecik is a village in Muş District, Muş Province, eastern Turkey. Its population is 683 (2021). Derecik is located 13 km away from Mus township.

There is a primary school in the village, drinking water network, electricity and landline telephone. The village is populated by Arabs.

History

Name
The Armenian name for the village was Havadarig or Havadorik not Derecik.

Population
In 1890, the Armenian church recorded one church and 90 Armenian households in the village, as well as 160 Kurdish households with similar numbers recorded in 1902.  The church records state  120 Armenian households in 1910 and on the eve of the genocide 165 households.

References 

Villages in Muş District
Kurdish settlements in Turkey